Sabina Hudribusch  (born 11 January 1967) is an Austrian freestyle skier. She was born in Vienna. She competed at the 1998 Winter Olympics in Nagano, in women's aerials.

References

External links 
 

1967 births
Living people
Sportspeople from Vienna
Austrian female freestyle skiers
Olympic freestyle skiers of Austria
Freestyle skiers at the 1998 Winter Olympics
20th-century Austrian women